The list of Newfoundland and Labrador by-elections includes every by-election held in the Canadian province of Newfoundland and Labrador. By-elections occur whenever there is a vacancy in the House of Assembly, although an imminent general election may allow the vacancy to remain until the dissolution of parliament. Starting in 1862 incumbent members were required to recontest their seats upon being appointed to Cabinet. This requirement was temporarily abolished due to World War I in 1917 and was permanently abolished in 1928. These Ministerial by-elections were almost always uncontested.

50th General Assembly of Newfoundland and Labrador 2021–present
no by-elections

49th General Assembly of Newfoundland and Labrador 2019–2021

48th General Assembly of Newfoundland and Labrador 2015–2019

47th General Assembly of Newfoundland and Labrador 2011–2015

46th General Assembly of Newfoundland and Labrador 2007–2011

45th General Assembly of Newfoundland and Labrador 2003–2007

*Manning was a former Progressive Conservative

44th General Assembly of Newfoundland and Labrador 1999–2003

43rd General Assembly of Newfoundland 1996–1999

42nd General Assembly of Newfoundland 1993–1996

41st General Assembly of Newfoundland 1989–1993

† Won by acclamation

40th General Assembly of Newfoundland 1985–1989

39th General Assembly of Newfoundland 1982–1985

38th General Assembly of Newfoundland 1979–1982

37th General Assembly of Newfoundland 1975–1979

36th General Assembly of Newfoundland 1972–1975

35th General Assembly of Newfoundland 1971–1972
no by-elections

34th General Assembly of Newfoundland 1966–1971

33rd General Assembly of Newfoundland 1962–1966

32nd General Assembly of Newfoundland 1959–1962

† Won by acclamation

31st General Assembly of Newfoundland 1956–1959

† Won by acclamation

30th General Assembly of Newfoundland 1951–1956

† Won by acclamation

29th General Assembly of Newfoundland 1949–1951
no by-elections

1934-1949
The Newfoundland House of Assembly was suspended when the Commission of Government was created in 1934. It was revived following Confederation with Canada in 1949.

28th General Assembly of Newfoundland 1932–1934
no by-elections

27th General Assembly of Newfoundland 1928–1932

† Won by acclamation

26th General Assembly of Newfoundland 1924–1928

† Won by acclamation

25th General Assembly of Newfoundland 1923–1924
no by-elections

24th General Assembly of Newfoundland 1919–1923

† Won by acclamation

23rd General Assembly of Newfoundland 1913–1919

† Won by acclamation

22nd General Assembly of Newfoundland 1909–1913

† Won by acclamation

21st General Assembly of Newfoundland 1908–1909
no by-elections

20th General Assembly of Newfoundland 1904–1908

† Won by acclamation

19th General Assembly of Newfoundland 1900–1904

† Won by acclamation

18th General Assembly of Newfoundland 1897–1900

† Won by acclamation

17th General Assembly of Newfoundland 1893–1897

† Won by acclamation

16th General Assembly of Newfoundland 1889–1893

† Won by acclamation

15th General Assembly of Newfoundland 1885–1889

† Won by acclamation

14th General Assembly of Newfoundland 1882–1885
no by-elections

13th General Assembly of Newfoundland 1878–1882

† Won by acclamation

12th General Assembly of Newfoundland 1874–1878
no by-elections

11th General Assembly of Newfoundland 1873–1874

10th General Assembly of Newfoundland 1869–1873

† Won by acclamation

9th General Assembly of Newfoundland 1865–1869

8th General Assembly of Newfoundland 1861–1865

7th General Assembly of Newfoundland 1859–1861

† Won by acclamation

6th General Assembly of Newfoundland 1855–1859

5th General Assembly of Newfoundland 1852–1854
no by-elections

4th General Assembly of Newfoundland 1848–1852

3rd General Assembly of Newfoundland 1842–1847

2nd General Assembly of Newfoundland 1837–1841

1st General Assembly of Newfoundland 1832–1836

† Won by acclamation

See also
 List of federal by-elections in Canada

References

 
 Elections Newfoundland and Labrador  - Elections Report

Elections in Newfoundland and Labrador
Newfoundland and Labrador, by-ele
Provincial by-elections in Newfoundland and Labrador
Elections, by